Óscar Eduardo Tigreros Urbano (born 28 July 1997) is a Colombian freestyle wrestler. He won the gold medal in the men's 57 kg event at the 2022 Bolivarian Games held in Valledupar, Colombia. He is also a South American Games gold medalist and two-time Pan American runner-up. He competed in the men's 57kg event at the 2020 Summer Olympics in Tokyo, Japan.

Career 

In 2018, he won the silver medal in the 57kg event at the Pan American Wrestling Championships and the silver medal in the 57kg event at the South American Games in Cochabamba, Bolivia. That year, he also won one of the bronze medals in the 57kg event at the 2018 Central American and Caribbean Games held in Barranquilla, Colombia.

He won the silver medal in the 57kg event at the 2019 Pan American Wrestling Championships held in Buenos Aires, Argentina. A few months later, he also competed in the 57kg event at the 2019 Pan American Games held in Lima, Peru without winning a medal; he lost his bronze medal match against Darthe Capellan of Canada.

In 2020, Tigreros qualified to represent Colombia at the 2020 Summer Olympics in Tokyo, Japan, when he recorded a silver-medal finish at the Pan American Olympic Qualification Tournament held in Ottawa, Canada.

He won one of the bronze medals in his event at the 2022 Pan American Wrestling Championships held in Acapulco, Mexico. He won the gold medal in his event at the 2022 Bolivarian Games held in Valledupar, Colombia. He defeated Enrique Herrera of Peru in his gold medal match.

He competed in the 57kg event at the 2022 World Wrestling Championships held in Belgrade, Serbia. He lost his first match against Zelimkhan Abakarov of Albania and he was eliminated in the repechage by Reineri Andreu of Cuba.

He won the gold medal in his event at the 2022 South American Games held in Asunción, Paraguay. He defeated Pedro Mejías of Venezuela in his gold medal match.

Achievements

References

External links 
 

Living people
1997 births
Colombian male sport wrestlers
Wrestlers at the 2014 Summer Youth Olympics
South American Games medalists in wrestling
South American Games gold medalists for Colombia
South American Games silver medalists for Colombia
Competitors at the 2018 South American Games
Competitors at the 2022 South American Games
Pan American Games competitors for Colombia
Wrestlers at the 2019 Pan American Games
Central American and Caribbean Games bronze medalists for Colombia
Competitors at the 2018 Central American and Caribbean Games
Central American and Caribbean Games medalists in wrestling
Pan American Wrestling Championships medalists
Wrestlers at the 2020 Summer Olympics
Olympic wrestlers of Colombia
Sportspeople from Valle del Cauca Department
21st-century Colombian people